Valea Chioarului is a commune in Maramureș County, Romania. It is composed of six villages: Curtuiușu Mare (Nagykörtvélyes), Durușa (Durusa), Fericea (Szamosfericse), Mesteacăn (Kisnyíres), Valea Chioarului and Vărai (Kőváralja).

See also 
 Wietenberg culture

References

External links 

Communes in Maramureș County